Korak may refer to:

 Korak people, indigenous people of Siberia
 Korak (character) – the son of Tarzan
 Korak, Semnan, Iran
 Korak, Nepal
 Korak, Pakistan

See also
 Karak (disambiguation)
 Korah